Keith Raymond Erickson (born April 19, 1944) is an American former basketball, and volleyball player.

After graduating from El Segundo High School (California), attended El Camino College. Erickson then played basketball at UCLA, where he was a member of the 1964 and 1965 NCAA Champion teams.  Erickson, who attended UCLA on a shared baseball/basketball scholarship, also played on the 1964 US Men's Olympic Volleyball team. Coach John Wooden would later remark that Erickson was the finest athlete he ever coached.

In 1965, he was selected by the San Francisco Warriors in the third round of the NBA draft.  Erickson played for the Warriors, Chicago Bulls, the 1972 NBA Champion Los Angeles Lakers, and Phoenix Suns. He had been traded along with a 1974 second-round selection (31st overall–Fred Saunders) from the Lakers to the Suns for Connie Hawkins on October 30, 1973.

Erickson retired in 1977 with 7,251 points and 3,449 rebounds. He later served as color commentator for the Los Angeles Lakers with Chick Hearn, the Los Angeles Clippers, the Phoenix Suns, and The NBA on CBS. He was inducted into the UCLA Athletics Hall of Fame in 1986 and was inducted into the Pac-12 Conference Men's Basketball Hall of Honor during the 2016 Pac-12 Conference men's basketball tournament.

References

External links
 John Wooden's first Championship
 Career statistics
 Keith Erickson answers questions from fans
 SANDS OF TIME, book excerpt
 Video: Erickson discusses Coach John Wooden

1944 births
Living people
All-American college men's basketball players
American men's volleyball players
Chicago Bulls expansion draft picks
Chicago Bulls players
El Segundo High School alumni
Los Angeles Clippers announcers
Los Angeles Lakers announcers
Phoenix Suns announcers
Los Angeles Lakers players
National Basketball Association broadcasters
Olympic volleyball players of the United States
Phoenix Suns players
San Francisco Warriors draft picks
San Francisco Warriors players
Shooting guards
Small forwards
Basketball players from San Francisco
UCLA Bruins men's basketball players
UCLA Bruins men's volleyball players
Volleyball players at the 1964 Summer Olympics
American men's basketball players